Brachodes formosa is a moth of the family Brachodidae. It is found in the southern Zagros Mountains of Iran.

References

Moths described in 1953
Brachodidae